TDRS-12, known before launch as TDRS-L, is an American communications satellite operated by NASA as part of the Tracking and Data Relay Satellite System. The twelfth Tracking and Data Relay Satellite, it is the second third-generation spacecraft to be launched, following TDRS-11 in 2013.

Spacecraft 
TDRS-12 was constructed by Boeing, based on the BSS-601HP satellite bus. It carries two steerable antennas capable of providing S, Ku and Ka band communications for other spacecraft, with an additional array of S-band transponders for lower-rate communications with five further satellites. The satellite is powered by two solar arrays, which produce 2.8 to 3.2 kilowatts of power, while an R-4D-11-300 engine is present to provide propulsion.

Launch 
The United Launch Alliance was contracted to launch TDRS-12. The spacecraft was launched on 24 January 2014 at 02:33 UTC (21:33 local time on 23 January). An Atlas V rocket was used, flying in the 401 configuration, with tail number AV-043. After launch, TDRS-12 was deployed into a high-perigee geosynchronous transfer orbit. The spacecraft raised itself into a geosynchronous orbit using its onboard propulsion system.

Gallery

See also 

 List of TDRS satellites

References

Spacecraft launched in 2014
Communications satellites in geostationary orbit
TDRS satellites
Spacecraft launched by Atlas rockets